The men's 3000 metres steeplechase event at the 2002 African Championships in Athletics was held in Radès, Tunisia on August 8.

Results

References

2002 African Championships in Athletics
Steeplechase at the African Championships in Athletics